Jacqueline Wolper Massawe born 18 December 1987, is a Tanzanian actress and fashion stylist. Wolper began her film career in 2007  and has featured in more than 30 films since her debut.

Early life and education
Wolper was born and raised in Moshi, Tanzania. She attended Mawenzi Primary School before moving to Magrath, Ekenywa and Masai for her secondary school. she Later took Language Course in ICC Arusha and other Business Studies.

Career
Wolper entered the Tanzanian film industry in 2007 whereby the veteran actress Lucy Komba discovered and convinced her to join movie industry. Wolper was working at her salon where by Lucy was one of her regular clients. She first appeared in the movie produced by Lucy Komba “ Ama Zako Ama Zangu “ where she played as a secretary. She later appeared in “Oprah” in one scene where by Steven Kanumba and his boss Mtitu Game liked her and cast her in “Family Tears” and “Red Valentine”. Her subsequently movies includes Kipenzi Changu, Family Tears, Red Valentine, Surprise, Chaguo Langu, Candy, Taxi Driver and many more.

Personal life
Wolper began dating the popular musician Harmonize in May 2016. However, the pair broke up in February 2017. She also had a relationship with his musical partner, Diamond Platnumz. Despite having an interest in Kenyan culture, Wolper stated she did not want to have a relationship with a Kenyan man.

In 2018, she announced that she had become a born-again Christian. Wolper is known for her controversial statements to the Tanzanian media, and she has expressed fear of being bewitched because of them.

Filmography

Film

Television

Awards and nominations

References

External links
 

Living people
Tanzanian film actresses
21st-century Tanzanian actresses
People from Kilimanjaro Region
1987 births